Schmirn is a municipality in the District Innsbruck-Land in the Austrian state of Tyrol.

Geography
The northern part of Sankt Jodok is part of Schmirn, while the remaining part is under the jurisdiction of the southern village of Vals.

Neighbour municipalities
Finkenberg, Navis, Steinach am Brenner, Tux, Vals, Wattenberg.

History
The Romans invaded the valley through Tux Jöchl pass, then used it as grazing land.
Schmirn was mentioned for the first time in 1249 as "Vallis Smurne" and became independent in 1811; until 1926 Hintertux, located in the Zillertal (Ziller Valley), was also part of the municipality. A church, dedicated to Saint Joseph, was built in 1756–1757 in Baroque style on project of Franz de Paula Penz and Seelsorger; in 1778 was raised to parish and was restored in 1958–1959.
In 1831 Franz Fuchs III founded the village band that it is still active.

Population

References

External links
  Wipptal

Innsbruck-Land District
Cities and towns in Innsbruck-Land District